Here & There (ヒアー・アンド・ゼアー) is the fourth studio album by Kiyotaka Sugiyama, released by VAP on May 17, 1989. The album charted on the Oricon charts at No. 2.

The album was made two months before Sugiyama's thirtieth birthday, and he wanted to change his style in some way.

The album was released on the same day its single, "Purizumu Rain ni Tsutsuma rete," was released. It was reissued on March 25, 1991 by Warner Music Japan with the previous single, "Boys of Eternity," being included as a bonus track. It was remastered in 2016.

Track listing

Charts

References 

1989 albums
J-pop albums